Olga Anatolyevna Bicherova (born 26 October 1967 or 26 October 1966 in Moscow, Russian SFSR) is a retired Soviet gymnast, who won the women's all-around gold medal at the 1981 World Artistic Gymnastics Championships.

Career 
Bicherova began gymnastics at age 7, initially training at the CSKA Moscow sports school and later representing the Armed Forces sports society. Her first major success was at the 1980 Junior Friendship Tournament, where she won the team gold, all-around title and placed first on the vault. A year later, Bicherova won the team gold and all-around gold at the 1981 World Championships, starting a series of major international successes, which included the all-around title at both the 1982 World Cup and the 1983 European Championships. She didn't compete at the boycotted 1984 Summer Olympics and also missed the Friendship Games. Olga's youthful appearance at the 1981 Gymnastics Championship caused many to question her age (supposedly 15), and hence her eligibility to compete.

Bicherova was an Honoured Master of Sports of the USSR. Due to an elbow injury, she retired from gymnastics in 1988 and worked as a coach for some time. She married fellow Soviet gymnast Valentin Mogilny.

Competitive history

References

External links 
 
 Olga Bicherova at Gymn-Forum.net
 

1967 births
Living people
Gymnasts from Moscow
Honoured Masters of Sport of the USSR
Soviet female artistic gymnasts
World champion gymnasts
Medalists at the World Artistic Gymnastics Championships
European champions in gymnastics